Justine Ayli Cuadra Gordon (born 17 August 1998) is an Ecuadorian footballer who plays as a midfielder for Deportivo Cuenca and the Ecuador women's national team.

Club career
Cuadra has played for Alianza, Talleres Emanuel, Carneras UPS, Guayaquil City and Deportivo Cuenca in Ecuador and for Colo-Colo in Chile.

International career
Cuadra capped for Ecuador at senior level during the 2018 Copa América Femenina.

References

External links

1998 births
Living people
Sportspeople from Guayaquil
Ecuadorian women's footballers
Women's association football midfielders
C.D. Cuenca Femenino players
Ecuador women's international footballers
21st-century Ecuadorian women